Madan–Harini is an Indian duo of choreographers consisting of Madan and Harini, who work predominantly in Kannada and Tulu cinema. Having choreographed in over 200 films, the duo is considered among the best in Kannada cinema.

Personal life and career
Madan and Harini, both based in Puttur, Karnataka, came to Bangalore in search for jobs. There, they trained with Rajarathnam Pillai in Indian classical dance and married soon after.

They first worked together as choreographers in films with Aryamba Pattabhi's Naadaswaroopi. They went on to work in popular Kannada films such as America America (1995), Hoomale (1998), Singaaravva (2003), Gaalipata (2008), and Tulu films Bangarda Kural (2012) and Rickshaw Driver (2013).

Films

 America America (1995)
 Akka (1997)
 Hoomale (1998)
 Neela (2001)
 Singaaravva (2003)
 Preethi Prema Pranaya (2003)
 Gaalipata (2008)
 Auto (2009)
 Kalgejje (2011)
 Karanika Shishu (2012)
 Bangarda Kural (2012)
 Rickshaw Driver (2013)
 Sweety Nanna Jodi (2013)
 Ambareesha (2014) 
 Drishya (2014)
 Soombe (2015)
 Mythri (2015)
 Super Marmaye (2015)

References

External links
 

Living people
People from Dakshina Kannada district
Indian female dancers
Indian film choreographers
Indian classical choreographers
Duos
Indian women choreographers
Indian choreographers
Dancers from Karnataka
Film people from Karnataka
Year of birth missing (living people)
21st-century Indian dancers
20th-century Indian dancers
20th-century Indian women